Posidippus of Cassandreia (Greek: Ποσείδιππος ὁ Κασσανδρεύς, Poseidippos ho Kassandreus; 316 – c. 250 BC) was a Greek comic poet of the New Comedy.

Life
He was the son of Cyniscus, a Macedonian who lived in Athens. He produced his first play in the third year after Menander had died (289 BC). 
Cooks held an important position in his list of characters. 
According to Aulus Gellius, Latin comic poets had imitated Posidippus. 
His success is shown in a beautiful portrait and sitting statue in the Vatican, which is considered a masterpiece of classical art.

In studying Posidippus' language, Augustus Meineke has detected some new words and old words used in a new sense, completely unknown to the best Attic writers.

Works
Suidas states that Posidippus wrote forty plays, of which the following eighteen titles (along with associated fragments) are preserved.

Ἀναβλέπων  (Anablepon) — The One Who Sees Again
Ἀποκλειομένη  (Apokleiomene) — The Barred Woman
Γαλάτης  (Galates) — The Gaul
Δήμοται  (Demotai) — Citizens
Ἑρμαφρόδιτος (Hermaphroditos) — The Hermaphrodite
Ἐπίσταθμος  (Epistathmos) — Harmost or Symposiarch
Ἐφεσία  (Ephesia) — The Ephesian Girl
Κώδων  (Codon) — The Bell
Λοκρίδες  (Locrides) — The Locrian Women
Μεταφερόμενοι  (Metapheromenoi) — The Transported Ones
Μύρμηξ  (Myrmex) — The Ant
Ὅμοιοι  (Homoioi) — People Who Resemble Each Other
Παιδίον  (Paidion) — The Little Child
Πορνοβοσκός  (Pornoboscos) — The Pimp
Σύντροφοι  (Syntrophoi) — Comrades
Φιλόσοφοι  (Philosophoi) — Philosophers
Φιλοπάτωρ  (Philopator) — The Father-loving
Χορεύουσαι  (Choreuousai) — Dancing Girls

Quotations
 But Posidippus the comic writer, in his Pornoboscus, says: "The man who never went to sea has never shipwrecked been. But we have been more miserable than monomachs."

 Now the comic poet Posidippus says of her these words, in The Woman from Ephesus (Ephesia): "Phryne was once the most illustrious of us courtesans by far. And even though you are too young to remember that time, you must at least have heard of her trial. Although she was thought to have wrought too great injury to men's lives, she nevertheless captured the court when tried for her life, and, clasping the hands of the judges, one by one, she with the help of her tears saved her life at last."

Posidippus sculpture

His statue in the Vatican is considered a masterpiece of ancient art.

References

Attribution

External links
Suidas Lexicon
Ancient Library
Graecorum comicorum fragmenta Augustus Meineke
Aulus Gellius Noctes Atticae Latin text — Attic Nights ii.23 Translation

Ancient Greek dramatists and playwrights
Writers of lost works
Roman copies of Greek sculptures
Sculptures of the Vatican Museums
Ancient Macedonian poets
Ancient Macedonians in Athens
Ancient Cassandreians
3rd-century BC Macedonians
New Comic poets
316 BC births
250s BC deaths